Nebraska Highway 133 is a highway in eastern Nebraska.  Its southern terminus is at an intersection with U.S. Highway 6 in Omaha.  Its northern terminus is at an intersection with U.S. Highway 30 in Blair.

Route description
Nebraska Highway 133 begins at US 6, also known as Dodge Street, in Omaha as a 4 lane divided highway and goes north along 90th Street in Omaha through residential and commercial areas.  Near Irvington, at an intersection with Nebraska Link 28K, also known as Blair High Road, it turns northwest and proceeds in a north-northwesterly direction towards Blair on an expressway.  It intersects Interstate 680 before heading into farmland and coming to Nebraska Highway 36. The highway then crosses from Douglas County to Washington County, and proceeds on to Blair where the route ends at a roundabout intersection with US 30.

Major intersections

References

External links

Nebraska Roads: NE 121-192

133
Transportation in Omaha, Nebraska
Transportation in Douglas County, Nebraska
Transportation in Washington County, Nebraska